Natusch is a surname. Notable people with the surname include:

Alberto Natusch (1933–1994), Bolivian general and dictator
Charles Natusch (1859–1951), New Zealand architect and quantity surveyor
Erich Natusch (1912–1999), German sailor
Guy Natusch (1921–2020), New Zealand architect
Sheila Natusch (1926–2017), New Zealand writer and illustrator
Tim Natusch (born 1986), New Zealand rugby league footballer